Patrick Brachner (born January 7, 1992 in Austria) is an Austrian-born Azerbaijani alpine skier. He competed for Azerbaijan at the 2014 Winter Olympics in the slalom and giant slalom. Brachner was also selected to carry the Azerbaijani flag during the 2014 opening ceremony.

Brachner originates from the town of Kematen an der Ybbs.

See also
Azerbaijan at the 2014 Winter Olympics

References

External links
 
 
 
 

1992 births
Living people
Austrian male alpine skiers
Azerbaijani male alpine skiers
Olympic alpine skiers of Azerbaijan
Alpine skiers at the 2014 Winter Olympics
Alpine skiers at the 2018 Winter Olympics
Naturalized citizens of Azerbaijan
Austrian expatriate sportspeople
Azerbaijani people of Austrian descent
People from Amstetten District
Sportspeople from Lower Austria